Land of the Free is a 1998 film directed by Jerry Jameson and starring Jeff Speakman and William Shatner.

Plot summary 
William Shatner plays the role of Aidan Carvell, a businessman running for Congress as an independent candidate with what is presented as a broadly libertarian agenda. Unknown to the public, Carvell is training and arming a militia force. Though the purpose of this private army is never wholly specified, a general sense of sinister intent is established. Carvell's political campaign manager Frank Jennings (played by Jeff Speakman) is persuaded by the FBI to assist them in indicting Carvell for treason. Carvell sets out to punish Jennings for this betrayal, requiring Jennings to fight for his own safety as well as that of his family.

Cast
William Shatner as Aidan Carvell 
Jeff Speakman as Frank Jennings 
Lisa Darr as Annie 
Chris Lemmon as Agent Thornton 
Larry Cedar as Green 
Cody Dorkin as Randy Jennings 
John Furey as Luckenbill 
Charlie Robinson as McCuster 
Robert Torti as Fitzpatrick 
Candice Azzara as Waitress 
Arthur Hiller as Judge 
Bobby Bragg as Andrews 
Tony Blassfield as Gilman 
Danny Breen as Bailiff 
Chris Byrne as Leader 
Alisa Cristensen as Helene 
Rance Howard as Hotel Manager 
Bernie Kopell as TV Host 
Signy Coleman as Reporter #2

References

External links
 

1998 films
American political thriller films
American action thriller films
1998 action thriller films
Films directed by Jerry Jameson
1990s English-language films
1990s American films